Tibicina haematodes is a species of cicadas  belonging to the family Cicadidae, subfamily Tibicininae.

Etymology
The species name haematodes is due to the fact that the veins of the forewing are brown-red.

Distribution
This species is present in Central and Southern Europe, in the Near East and in North Africa.

References

Hemiptera of Europe
Insects described in 1763
Tibicinini
Taxa named by Giovanni Antonio Scopoli